Christian Juncker (born in Holstebro, Denmark) better known by his mononym Juncker is a Danish pop singer, songwriter and guitarist signed to Columbia Records, and later to ArtPeople and eventually Target Records.

He started in 1995 in the Danish band Bloom and in the 2000s formed for some time a duo in collaboration with Jakob Groth Bastiansen known also as Juncker.
 
Christian has developed a solo singer-songwriter career and had a comeback with the song "Havana" in 2014, the theme of the Danish television series Kurs Mod Fjerne Kyster. The sing was co-written by Christian Juncker and Henrik Balling.

He also worked as a musical pop duo for some time

Discography

Albums

Singles
Promotional singles
2004: "Snork City Blues"
2004: "Mogens og Karen"
2006: "Bad Vibes"

Singles

References

External links
Facebook
Discogs

Danish male singers
Danish songwriters
Living people
Year of birth missing (living people)
People from Holstebro